Spotlight Comics was an American comic publisher based in western Connecticut. It is best known for a short run of comic books based on licensed characters such as Mighty Mouse and Heckle and Jeckle that contained contributions from several major US comic book creators.

Company history
After beginning his career in collectible magazines such as the Comics Collector and Toy Values Monthly, Richard "Rich" Maurizio and his then-significant other Kelley Jarvis wrote, drew, and published two issues of a comic entitled Samurai Squirrel: Master of the Sword, under the publisher name Spotlight Comics starting in 1983. They also produced a comic containing reprints of the daily Stern Wheeler comic strip from The Hartford Times, illustrated by Jim Aparo, and another comic, L. T. Caper, Agent for H.E.R.O. (the Higher Espionage Reinforcement Organization), written and drawn by Maurizio. 

Spotlight expanded into licensed character comics and acquired the rights to Mighty Mouse, Underdog, and other properties. The company ran into financial problems in 1988 and ceased operations in 1989. In the end, they only produced a total of 11 individual issues of their various titles.

Notable writers and artists who contributed to the Spotlight titles included Curt Swan, Joe Gill, Win Mortimer, Frank Mclaughlin, Tom Moore, Gary Fields, Bill White, Ray Dirgo, Doug Cushman, Nate Butler, Jim Engel, John A. Wilcox, Mark Marcus, Milton Knight, Paul Chadwick, and Mike Tiefenbacher. 

The Spotlight Comics titles were all edited by Jim Main.

Post-Spotlight 
After Spotlight's demise, Maurizio and Jarvis co-produced the Tom & Jerry comic strip for a five-year run. 

In the late 1990s and early 2000s, Maurizio packaged and edited licensed comics such as The Munsters and I Dream of Jeannie for the short-lived publishers TV Comics and Airwave Comics.

Titles published
 One issue published per title, unless otherwise noted

Original titles 
 Samurai Squirrel (1986–1987) — 2 issues
 Stern Wheeler #1 (1986)
 L.T. Caper (1986)

Licensed characters 
 The Beagles #5 (1989) - 6 issues
 Mighty Heroes (1987)
 Mighty Mouse (1987) — 2 issues
 Mighty Mouse and Friends Holiday Special (1987)
 Mighty Mouse Adventure Magazine (1987)
 Underdog #2 (1987) — 3 issues
 Tennessee Tuxedo #3 (1986) - 4 issues
 King Leonardo #4 (1983) - 5 issues

Characters
 Mighty Mouse
 Heckle and Jeckle
 Underdog
 King Leonardo
 Tennessee Tuxedo
 The Beagles
 Deputy Dawg

References

External links
 Grand Comics Database: Spotlight Comics
 Grand Comics Database: Richard Maurizio
 Michigan State University Libraries/Special Collections Division/Reading Room Index to the Comic Art Collection: Spotlight Comics

Publishing companies disestablished in 1989
Defunct comics and manga publishing companies
Publishing companies established in 1983
1983 establishments in the United States